Jackson Heights may refer to:

Places 
Canada
 Jackson Heights, Edmonton, Alberta

United States
 Jackson Heights, Tampa, Florida
 Jackson Heights, Queens, New York
 Jackson Heights, Jackson County, Ohio
 Jackson Heights, Jefferson County, Ohio

Other uses 
 Jackson Heights (band)
 Jackson Heights (TV series), a Pakistani drama serial

See also
82nd Street–Jackson Heights station, a subway station in New York City
Jackson Heights–Roosevelt Avenue/74th Street station, a subway station complex in New York City
North Jackson USD 335, formerly Jackson Heights, a K–12 school district near Holton, Kansas